The 2009 Australian Rally Championship season is the 42nd season in the history of the competition.

It is also the first since the mid-1980s to take place with no significant manufacturer support after Toyota withdrew its support of the Bates Motor Sport rally team which has competed as Toyota Team Australia since the early 1990s. Toyota did fund the team's final appearance at the tarmac Rally Tasmania, but after that Neal Bates had to find other sources of funding for his Corolla. Simon Evans left the team, taking up the reins of a Mitsubishi Lancer Evolution IX under the banner of his own personal building business. Despite this setback, Evans and his wife Sue regained the title they had lost the previous year to their now former boss. Bates could only manage third in the title, finishing behind one of the Corollas he had previously built to the Group N+ regulations, driven by an ever-consistent Glen Raymond. Evans younger brother Eli slipped to fourth in the standings after beating Simon into second position last year.

The Rallies

The 2009 season featured six rallies, the first five of which contribute to the drivers' title. The sixth, the newly reinstated Rally Australia, will contribute only to the manufacturers standings.

Teams & Drivers

The following are the competitors from the 2009 ARC season.

Drivers Championship

References

Rally Championship
Rally competitions in Australia
Australia